Prince Ivan Sergeyevich Obolensky (May 15, 1925 – January 29, 2019) was an American financial analyst and corporate officer. He was previously commissioned in the United States Navy, serving as a Flight Lieutenant, and had also been a publisher. He died on January 29, 2019.

Early life
Obolensky was born in London, England, on May 15, 1925, to Sergei Platonovich "Serge" Obolensky and Ava Alice Muriel Astor. Paternally, he belonged to the Obolensky family of Russian princes who trace their lineage to the Rurikid rulers of Russia who preceded the Romanov emperors. Through his mother, he was a great-great-great-grandson of John Jacob Astor and the elder grandson of John Jacob Astor IV, who died on the RMS Titanic and is thus, a member of the Astor family.

Obolensky was educated at St. George's School in Middletown, Rhode Island, and graduated from Yale College in New Haven, Connecticut, in 1947. While at Yale, he was a member of St. Elmo, a senior secret society.

Career
After Yale, Obolensky became a writer working for Telavid Inc. Imports, and went on to serve with the United States Navy as a pilot. In 1957, he formed a publishing firm McDowell, Obolensky Inc. with a partner, David McDowell. The firm published James Agee's Pulitzer Prize-winning novel, A Death in the Family (1957), and was the U.S. publisher for Chinua Achebe's Things Fall Apart (1959). It was dissolved in 1960. Obolensky then formed a second publishing house, Ivan Obolensky, Inc. This firm continued through 1965, when he joined the investment banking firm of A. T. Brod & Company as a partner. The publishing house continued until 1968 under the name Astor-Honor.

Throughout his main career on Wall Street as a financial analyst, Obolensky covered many prestigious accounts. He was Vice President of Moseley, Hallgarten, Estabrook & Weeden Inc., Stock brokers and Vice President of Shields & Company. Obolensky was an active member of the philanthropic community in New York. He was, for many years, an active supporter of the Soldiers', Sailors', Marines', Coast Guard and Airmen's Club, and New York's International Debutante Ball, which benefits the club. He was also Treasurer of the Russian Nobility Association in America, Inc., and the US Prior of the Orthodox Order of St. John.

Personal life
Obolensky first married in New York City on October 10, 1949, to Claire Elizabeth McGinnis (1929–2015). Claire was educated at the Convent of the Sacred Heart in San Francisco, the Finch Junior College in Manhattan, and at Miss Burke's School in San Francisco. She was the daughter of Felix Signoret McGinnis (1883–1945), vice-president of the Southern Pacific Company, and Clara (née Leonhardt) McGinnis (1887–1984). Before their divorce in 1956, Ivan and Claire were the parents of one daughter and two sons:

Princess Marina "Maria" Ivanovna Obolensky (b. 1951), who married N. Carlton. She later married William D. Folwick (1932–2017).
Prince Ivan Ivanovich Obolensky (b. 1952), who married Mary Jo Smith without issue.
Prince David Ivanovich Obolensky (b. 1953), who married Mary Catherine Hicks (b. 1952) on March 21, 1981.

After their divorce, Claire married designer and art advisor Garrick C. Stephenson (1927–2007). On October 22, 1959, Obolensky married for the second time to Mary Elizabeth Morris (1934–2006). Together, they were the parents of one son:

Prince Sergei Ivanovich Obolensky (b. 1960), who married Ceceila Chapman Justice (b. 1956) in 1986.

Descendants
Through his son David, he was the grandfather of Princess Natalya Elizabeth Davidovna Obolensky (b. 1984) and Princess Octavia Willing Davidovna Obolensky (b. 1989).

Through his son Serge, he was the grandfather of Prince Alexander Vasily Sergeyevich Obolensky (b. 1994) and Prince Christopher Chapman Sergeyevich Obolensky (b. 1999).

Death
Prince Ivan died on January 29, 2019. His funeral was held at the Church of the Incarnation in New York City.

See also 
Burke's Peerage & Baronetage

References

External links

www.ancestry.com
www.ancestry.com

1925 births
2019 deaths
Rurikids
Ivan Sergeyevich
Astor family
Schermerhorn family
Livingston family
British emigrants to the United States
Yale College alumni
St. George's School (Rhode Island) alumni
United States Navy officers
United States Naval Aviators